Pear Valley is an unincorporated community in McCulloch County, Texas, United States. According to the Handbook of Texas, the community had an estimated population of 37 in 2000.

Pear Valley contains two churches and two businesses. Pear Valley sits between Texas State Highway 83 and Texas State Highway 283.

References

External links
 

Unincorporated communities in McCulloch County, Texas
Unincorporated communities in Texas